Walach is a surname. Notable people with the surname include:

Harald Walach (born 1957), German psychologist
Magdalena Walach (born 1976), Polish actress